Jasvantsinh Sumanbhai Bhabhor (born 22 August 1966) is a former Minister of State for Tribal affairs in the Government of India, an Indian politician, and a member of parliament to the 16th Lok Sabha and the 17th Lok Sabha from Dahod (Lok Sabha constituency), Gujarat. He won the 2014 Indian general election, being a Bharatiya Janata Party candidate.

He is resident of Bariya Faliyu at Dasa, in Limkheda Taluka of Dahod district.

He is a farmer and social worker by profession.  He was born on 22 August 1966, in a poor tribal family in village Dasa, a remote village in Limkheda, Dahod District. His father, Shri Sumanbhai Rangjibhai Bhabhor, was a primary teacher by profession.

He took his education at Vidhyanagar. He holds bachelor's degree in Arts and bachelor's degree in Education.

He has been a full-time social worker and educator, besides being an agriculturist by inheritance. He has establish no of Educational institutes in an around his native village. His educational institutes provides education right from Primary level to College including PTC and Bed colleges, catering to the long felt need of the area. He has also established boy's and girl's hostel, Ashram shala for the poor students coming from far off villages for their educational needs.

He was active in politics since his young age, as his father was also associated with Jansangh in erstwhile Panchmahal district.

He was first elected to the ninth Gujarat legislative assembly in 1995–97. Since then he has been elected to all subsequent legislative assemblies of Gujarat till his election to parliament in 2014.

He was elected to the tenth Gujarat legislative assembly from 1998 to 2002, during which he worked as Deputy Minister for Food and Civil supplies in the Government of Gujarat during 1999-2001 and also as Minister of State for Health and Family welfare during 2001–02.

He was also the chairman of the Gujarat State Tribal Development Corporation during 1998–99.

He was again elected to the eleventh Gujarat legislative assembly 2002–07, during which he worked as Minister of State for Forests and Environment from 1 August 2005 to 24 December 2007.

He was also elected to the twelfth Gujarat legislative assembly 2002–2007, during which he worked as Minister of State for Tribal Development, Rural Development, Labor and Employment from 2007 to 2010 and also as Minister of State for Tribal development, Panchayat and Rural Housing from 2010 till his election in the Parliamentary Elections of 2014.

He has also performed as Guardian Minister for Sabarkantha and Dang districts during 2007-2010 and also as Guardian Minister for Narmada district from 2010 till his Election in the Parliamentary elections of 2014.

He has also been three times Chairman of the committee of Gujarat legislative assembly on scheduled Tribes.

References

India MPs 2014–2019
Lok Sabha members from Gujarat
Living people
People from Dahod district
1957 births
Bharatiya Janata Party politicians from Gujarat
India MPs 2019–present
Narendra Modi ministry